Lions in the Street: The Inside Story of the Great Wall Street Law Firms is a 1973 book by Paul Hoffman.

Overview
The book describes the great Wall Street law firms of the 1970s, prominent cases, traditions and a community of high-profile lawyers. Some famous names discussed: Cravath, Swaine & Moore; Davis Polk & Wardwell; Lord Day & Lord; Donovan, Leisure, Newton & Irvine; Cleary, Gottlieb, Steen & Hamilton; Carter, Ledyard & Milburn; Coudert Brothers; Covington & Burling, and others.

The name of the book might be inspired by Celebration of the Lizard, a performance piece written in 1970 by Jim Morrison, frontman of The Doors.

Contents
 The Congress of Vienna Sits on the Fifty-seventh Floor
 Downtown, Midtown, All Around the World
 The $100-an-hour Toll Collectors
 Some Partners are more Equal than Others
 The Care and Feeding of Corporate Clients—I
 The Care and Feeding of Corporate Clients—II
 "As my Lawyer, Dick Nixon, said the Other Day..."
 The Workers Are the Means of Production
 A Lot Goes on Behind Closed Doors
 The Green-goods Councel as the Big Board's Cop
 The Public Servant as Private Lawyer
 The Private Lawyer as Public Servant
 The Greetings of the Bar Association
 On Different Wavelengths

Official information
 Lions in the Street, alongside different books by Paul Hoffman were translated to up to 30 different languages.

References

External links
 www.worldcat.org
 ANTIQBOOK

Law books
1973 non-fiction books
Saturday Review Press books